Leslie G. Ungerleider (April 17, 1946 – December 11, 2020) was an experimental psychologist and neuroscientist, previously Chief of the Laboratory of Brain and Cognition at the National Institute of Mental Health.  Ungerleider was known for introducing the concepts of the dorsal (where) and ventral (what) streams, two pathways of information processing in the brain that specialize in visuospatial processing and object recognition, respectively.

Ungerleider received a B.A. from Binghamton University and a Ph.D. in experimental psychology from New York University, and she completed a postdoctoral fellowship with Karl Pribram at Stanford University, where she began her work on higher-order perceptual mechanisms in the cortex of primates. In 1975 she moved to the National Institute of Mental Health, where she remained for the remainder of her career, initially joining Mortimer Mishkin in the Laboratory of Neuropsychology and establishing her own laboratory in 1995. In 2001, she was the recipient of the Women in Neuroscience Lifetime Achievement Award and in 2008 she became an NIH Distinguished Investigator. L. Ungerleider and M. Mishkin won the 2012 University of Louisville Grawemeyer Award for Psychology.

Ungerleider was elected to the National Academy of Sciences (2000), the American Academy of Arts and Sciences (2000) the Institute of Medicine of the National Academy of Sciences (2001), and the Society of Experimental Psychologists. In 2009 she received the William James Fellow Award by the Association for Psychological Science in recognition of how her research 'advanced our understanding of brain function and its relevance to public health' and also for her mentorship of young researchers as an outstanding lecturer.

References

External links
Leslie Ungerleider's Homepage
Laboratory of Brain and Cognition at NIMH
Leslie Ungerlieder's Neurotree page

1946 births
2020 deaths
American women neuroscientists
American cognitive neuroscientists
Memory researchers
Binghamton University alumni
New York University alumni
Fellows of the Society of Experimental Psychologists
Fellows of the American Academy of Arts and Sciences
Members of the United States National Academy of Sciences
21st-century American women scientists
Members of the National Academy of Medicine